The 2000–01 Gonzaga Bulldogs men's basketball team (also informally referred to as the Zags) represented Gonzaga University in the 2000–01 NCAA Division I men's basketball season. The team was led by head coach Mark Few, in his 2nd season as head coach, and played their home games at the Charlotte Y. Martin Centre in Spokane, Washington. This was the Bulldogs' 21st season as a member of the West Coast Conference. Gonzaga reached the Sweet Sixteen of the NCAA tournament for the 3rd consecutive season.

Roster

Schedule and results

|-
!colspan=9| Regular season

|-
!colspan=9| 2001 West Coast Conference tournament

|-
!colspan=9| 2001 NCAA tournament

Rankings

Awards and honors
Casey Calvary – WCC Player of the Year
Mark Few – WCC Coach of the Year

References

Gonzaga Bulldogs
Gonzaga Bulldogs men's basketball seasons
Gonzaga Bulldogs men's basketball
Gonzaga Bulldogs men's basketball
Gonzaga